Protocol I (also Additional Protocol I and AP I) is a 1977 amendment protocol to the Geneva Conventions concerning the protection of civilian victims of international war, such as "armed conflicts in which peoples are fighting against colonial domination, alien occupation or racist regimes." In practice, Additional Protocol I updated and reaffirmed the international laws of war stipulated in the Geneva Conventions of 1949 to accommodate developments of warfare since the Second World War (1937–1945).

Ratification status 
As of February 2020, it had been ratified by 174 states, with the United States, Israel, Iran, Pakistan, India, and Turkey being notable exceptions. However, the United States, Iran, and Pakistan signed it on 12 December 1977, which signifies an intention to work towards ratifying it. The Iranian Revolution has occurred in the interim.

Russia 

On 16 October 2019, President Vladimir Putin signed an executive order and submitted a State Duma bill to revoke the statement accompanying Russia's ratification of the Protocol I, accepting the competence of the Article 90 International Fact-Finding Commission. The bill was supplied with the following warning:

The available reports regarding this action do not indicate that Russia has revoked their accession to Protocol I as a whole, and the Russian Federation is still included on the lists of parties maintained by the International Committee of the Red Cross and by the United Nations.

Summary of provisions 
Protocol I is an extensive document, containing 102 articles. The following is a basic overview of the protocol. For a comprehensive listing of all provisions, consult the text and the commentary.
In general, the protocol reaffirms the provisions of the original four Geneva Conventions. However, the following additional protections are added.
Article I states that the convention applies in "armed conflicts in which peoples are fighting against colonial domination and alien occupation and against racist régimes in the exercise of their right of self-determination", which has been interpreted as favoring terrorism, and denying protections to Israel, since United Nations General Assembly Resolution 3379 ("Zionism is racism") was in effect at that time.
 Article 37 prohibits perfidy. It identifies four types of perfidy and differentiates ruses of war from perfidy.
 Article 40 prohibits no quarter, including that there are no survivors, to threaten an adversary as such, or to conduct hostilities on that basis.
 Article 42 outlaws attacks on pilots and aircrews who are parachuting from an aircraft in distress. Once they landed in territory controlled by an adverse party, they must be given an opportunity to surrender before being attacked unless it is apparent that they are engaging in a hostile act or attempting to escape. Airborne troops, or agents who are parachuting from an aircraft, whether in distress or not, are not given the protection afforded by this Article and, therefore, may be attacked during their descent.
 Article 43 deals with the identification of Armed Forces that are Party to a conflict, and states that combatants "shall be subject to an internal disciplinary system which, inter alia, shall enforce compliance with the rules of international law applicable in armed conflict."
 Article 47(1) "A mercenary shall not have the right to be a combatant or a prisoner of war."
 Articles 51 and 54 outlaw indiscriminate attacks on civilian populations, and destruction of food, water, and other materials needed for survival. Indiscriminate attacks include directly attacking civilian (non-military) targets, but also using technology such as biological weapons, nuclear weapons, and land mines, whose scope of destruction cannot be limited. A total war that does not distinguish between civilian and military targets is considered a war crime.
 Articles 56 and 53 outlaw attacks on dams, dikes, nuclear electrical-generating stations, and places of worship. The first three are "works and installations containing dangerous forces" and may be attacked only in ways that do not threaten to release the dangerous forces (i.e., it is permissible to capture them but not to destroy them).
 Articles 76 and 77, 15 and 79 provide special protections for women, children, and civilian medical personnel, and provide measures of protection for journalists.
 Article 77 forbids conscription of children under age 15 into the armed forces. It does allow, however, for persons under the age of 15 to participate voluntarily.
 Articles 43 and 44 clarify the military status of members of guerrilla forces. Combatant and prisoner of war status are granted to members of dissident forces when under the command of a central authority. Such combatants cannot conceal their allegiance; they must be recognizable as combatants while preparing for or during an attack.
 Article 35 bans weapons that "cause superfluous injury or unnecessary suffering", as well as means of warfare that "cause widespread, long-term, and severe damage to the natural environment".
 Article 85 states that it is a war crime to use one of the protective emblems recognized by the Geneva Conventions to deceive the opposing forces (perfidy).
 Articles 17 and 81 authorize the ICRC, national societies, or other impartial humanitarian organizations to provide assistance to the victims of war.
 Article 90 states that "The High Contracting Parties may at the time of signing, ratifying or acceding to the Protocol, or at any other subsequent time, declare that they recognize ipso facto and without special agreement, in relation to any other High Contracting Party accepting the same obligation, the competence of the [International Fact-Finding] Commission to enquire into allegations by such other Party, as authorized by this Article." 74 states have made such a declaration.

See also 
 Command responsibility
 Geneva Conventions
 List of parties to the Geneva Conventions
 First Geneva Convention on the treatment of battlefield casualties in the field
 Jus in bello
 Targeted killing
 Protocol II, a 1977 amendment adopted relating to the protection of victims of non-international armed conflicts
 Protocol III, a 2005 amendment adopted specifying the adoption of the Red Crystal emblem
 United Nations Mercenary Convention

Notes

References

External links 
 Full text of Protocol I
 List of countries that have signed but not yet ratified Protocol I
 International Review of the Red Cross, 1997 – No. 320 Special issue: 20th anniversary of the 1977 Additional Protocols
 1977 Additional Protocolsshort bibliography (by ICRC)
 "New rules for victims of armed conflicts, Commentary on the two 1977 Protocols additional to the Geneva Conventions of 1949", by M. Bothe, K.J.Partsch, W.A. Solf, Pub: Martinus Nijhoff The Hague/Boston/London, 1982, 
 U.S. President Ronald Reagan's message to the Senate on Protocols I & II 

Geneva Conventions
Arms control treaties
Treaties concluded in 1977
Treaties entered into force in 1978
Treaties of Afghanistan
Treaties of Albania
Treaties of Algeria
Treaties of the People's Republic of Angola
Treaties of Antigua and Barbuda
Treaties of Argentina
Treaties of Armenia
Treaties of Australia
Treaties of Austria
Treaties of the Bahamas
Treaties of Bahrain
Treaties of Bangladesh
Treaties of Barbados
Treaties of the Byelorussian Soviet Socialist Republic
Treaties of Belgium
Treaties of Belize
Treaties of the People's Republic of Benin
Treaties of Bolivia
Treaties of Bosnia and Herzegovina
Treaties of Botswana
Treaties of Brazil
Treaties of Brunei
Treaties of the People's Republic of Bulgaria
Treaties of Burkina Faso
Treaties of Burundi
Treaties of Cambodia
Treaties of Cameroon
Treaties of Canada
Treaties of Cape Verde
Treaties of the Central African Republic
Treaties of Chad
Treaties of Chile
Treaties of the People's Republic of China
Treaties of Colombia
Treaties of the Comoros
Treaties of Zaire
Treaties of the Republic of the Congo
Treaties of the Cook Islands
Treaties of Costa Rica
Treaties of Ivory Coast
Treaties of Croatia
Treaties of Cuba
Treaties of Cyprus
Treaties of the Czech Republic
Treaties of Czechoslovakia
Treaties of Denmark
Treaties of Djibouti
Treaties of Dominica
Treaties of the Dominican Republic
Treaties of East Timor
Treaties of Ecuador
Treaties of Egypt
Treaties of El Salvador
Treaties of Equatorial Guinea
Treaties of Estonia
Treaties of the Transitional Government of Ethiopia
Treaties of Fiji
Treaties of Finland
Treaties of France
Treaties of Gabon
Treaties of the Gambia
Treaties of Georgia (country)
Treaties of Germany
Treaties of Ghana
Treaties of Greece
Treaties of Grenada
Treaties of Guatemala
Treaties of Guinea
Treaties of Guinea-Bissau
Treaties of Guyana
Treaties of Haiti
Treaties of the Holy See
Treaties of Honduras
Treaties of the Hungarian People's Republic
Treaties of Iceland
Treaties of Ireland
Treaties of Italy
Treaties of Jamaica
Treaties of Japan
Treaties of Jordan
Treaties of Kazakhstan
Treaties of Kenya
Treaties of North Korea
Treaties of South Korea
Treaties of Kuwait
Treaties of Kyrgyzstan
Treaties of Laos
Treaties of Latvia
Treaties of Lebanon
Treaties of Lesotho
Treaties of Liberia
Treaties of the Libyan Arab Jamahiriya
Treaties of Liechtenstein
Treaties of Lithuania
Treaties of Luxembourg
Treaties of North Macedonia
Treaties of Madagascar
Treaties of Malawi
Treaties of the Maldives
Treaties of Mali
Treaties of Malta
Treaties of Mauritania
Treaties of Mauritius
Treaties of Mexico
Treaties of the Federated States of Micronesia
Treaties of Moldova
Treaties of Monaco
Treaties of Mongolia
Treaties of Montenegro
Treaties of Morocco
Treaties of the People's Republic of Mozambique
Treaties of Namibia
Treaties of Nauru
Treaties of the Netherlands
Treaties of New Zealand
Treaties of Nicaragua
Treaties of Niger
Treaties of Nigeria
Treaties of Norway
Treaties of Oman
Treaties of Palau
Treaties of the State of Palestine
Treaties of Panama
Treaties of Paraguay
Treaties of Peru
Treaties of the Philippines
Treaties of Poland
Treaties of Portugal
Treaties of Qatar
Treaties of Romania
Treaties of Rwanda
Treaties of Saint Kitts and Nevis
Treaties of Saint Lucia
Treaties of Saint Vincent and the Grenadines
Treaties of Samoa
Treaties of San Marino
Treaties of São Tomé and Príncipe
Treaties of Saudi Arabia
Treaties of Senegal
Treaties of Serbia and Montenegro
Treaties of Seychelles
Treaties of Sierra Leone
Treaties of Slovakia
Treaties of Slovenia
Treaties of the Solomon Islands
Treaties of South Africa
Treaties of South Sudan
Treaties of the Soviet Union
Treaties of Spain
Treaties of the Republic of the Sudan (1985–2011)
Treaties of Suriname
Treaties of Eswatini
Treaties of Sweden
Treaties of Switzerland
Treaties of Syria
Treaties of Tajikistan
Treaties of Tanzania
Treaties of Togo
Treaties of Tonga
Treaties of Trinidad and Tobago
Treaties of Tunisia
Treaties of Turkmenistan
Treaties of Uganda
Treaties of the Ukrainian Soviet Socialist Republic
Treaties of the United Arab Emirates
Treaties of the United Kingdom
Treaties of Uruguay
Treaties of Uzbekistan
Treaties of Vanuatu
Treaties of Venezuela
Treaties of Vietnam
Treaties of Yemen
Treaties of Yugoslavia
Treaties of Zambia
Treaties of Zimbabwe
Treaties extended to Greenland
Treaties extended to the Faroe Islands
Treaties extended to the Netherlands Antilles
Treaties extended to Aruba
Treaties extended to Anguilla
Treaties extended to Bermuda
Treaties extended to the British Antarctic Territory
Treaties extended to the British Indian Ocean Territory
Treaties extended to the British Virgin Islands
Treaties extended to the Cayman Islands
Treaties extended to the Falkland Islands
Treaties extended to Montserrat
Treaties extended to the Pitcairn Islands
Treaties extended to Saint Helena, Ascension and Tristan da Cunha
Treaties extended to South Georgia and the South Sandwich Islands
Treaties extended to Akrotiri and Dhekelia
Treaties extended to the Turks and Caicos Islands
Treaties extended to Guernsey
Treaties extended to the Isle of Man
Treaties extended to Jersey
Treaties extended to Hong Kong
Treaties extended to Macau